Pennsylvania Route 534 (PA 534) is an  state highway located in Monroe and Carbon counties in Pennsylvania.  The western terminus is at PA 940 in East Side.  The eastern terminus is at U.S. Route 209 (US 209) in the community of Kresgeville in Polk Township. PA 534 runs northwest-southeast through forested areas of the Pocono Mountains as a two-lane undivided road. The route has an interchange with Interstate 80 (I-80) near East Side before it passes through Hickory Run State Park. PA 534 crosses PA 903 near Albrightsville and continues south to US 209. The roadway was paved in the 1930s and received the PA 534 designation in the 1960s.

Route description

PA 534 begins at an intersection with PA 940 on the border of the borough of East Side and Kidder Township in Carbon County, heading south on a two-lane undivided road. The route forms the border between East Side to the west and Kidder Township to the east, heading through a mix of fields and woods with some businesses as it comes to an interchange with I-80. The road heads into forested areas and passes to the east of a golf course as it fully enters Kidder Township, curving to the southwest. PA 534 reaches the community of Lehigh Tannery, turning to the southeast before continuing east into dense forests. The road heads into Hickory Run State Park and turns southeast before curving northeast and passing through Hickory Run. The route runs east through more forested areas of the state park, heading east-southeast and passing under I-476 (Pennsylvania Turnpike Northeast Extension).

PA 534 leaves Hickory Run State Park and heads through more wooded areas with some farm fields and homes, passing through Albrightsville before passing to the south of the residential development of Holiday Pocono and intersecting PA 903. A short distance later, the road crosses into Penn Forest Township and turns southeast, running through more woodland with some farmland and residences. The route passes to the southeast of a lake before running through Meckesville and the wooded residential development of Indian Mountain Lake before turning south.

PA 534 enters Polk Township in Monroe County and heads east near the wooded residential development of Pleasant Valley Estates before turning southeast and passing through Jonas. The road continues south through more farmland and woodland with homes, passing near the private development of Pleasant Valley Estates. Farther south, PA 534 comes to its eastern terminus at an intersection with US 209 in the community of Kresgeville.

History
When Pennsylvania first legislated routes in 1911, what is now PA 534 was not given a number. By 1930, the highway between East Side and Kresgeville was an unnumbered, unpaved road. This stretch of road was paved during the 1930s. PA 534 was designated onto its current alignment between PA 940 in East Side and US 209 in Kresgeville in the 1960s, with an interchange at I-80 south of East Side.

Major intersections

See also

References

External links

Pennsylvania Highways: PA 534

534
Transportation in Carbon County, Pennsylvania
Transportation in Monroe County, Pennsylvania